Temptation is a 2014 South Korean television series starring Kwon Sang-woo, Choi Ji-woo, Lee Jung-jin and Park Ha-sun. It aired on SBS from July 14 to September 16, 2014, on Mondays and Tuesdays at 21:55 for 20 episodes. The drama reunites Choi Ji-woo and Kwon Sang-woo who both starred in the 2003 hit melodrama Stairway to Heaven.

Plot
Cha Seok-hoon is a naive man who grew up a rural village in Gangwon Province. His intellect gets him into the country's top university despite his family's economic plight, and he takes on all sorts of part-time jobs, from quick services to construction work, in order to earn his tuition.

He then meets Na Hong-joo, a girl also from a poor family. Hong-joo is resigned to a miserable existence, until Seok-hoon brings happiness and hope into her life. They get married, and Hong-joo is a calm and understanding wife, always the first to sacrifice and make concessions. However, Seok-hoon finds himself plunged into massive debt due to a failed business venture with another partner.

Yoo Se-young is a hotel heiress, trained to take over her father's company from a young age. Called a "woman of iron," she is a workaholic and a headstrong leader, and has no interest in love or marriage. One of her family friends is rich playboy Kang Min-woo, who unsuccessfully tried to seduce her in the past. Min-woo has everything he could ever want, and approaches life with the philosophy that you should have a hundred different faces for a hundred different women. He got married only because it was a requirement for his inheritance.

While on a business trip to Hong Kong, Se-young meets Seok-hoon and Hong-joo, and for her amusement, she makes them a dangerous offer to test their marriage: In exchange for paying off Seok-hoon's debts so that he could avoid going to jail, she asks for three days with him.

Seok-hoon makes a crucial choice and takes the deal. But his strange relationship with Yoo Se-young jeopardizes his marriage. Upon their return to Korea, Seok-hoon and Hong-joo's marriage is unable to survive this crisis of trust, and they eventually divorce. Meanwhile, Se-young finds herself genuinely falling for Seok-hoon.

Cast

Main characters
Kwon Sang-woo as Cha Seok-hoon 
Choi Ji-woo as Yoo Se-young 
Lee Jung-jin as Kang Min-woo 
Park Ha-sun as Na Hong-joo

Supporting characters 
Chae So-young as Yoo Se-jin
Kim Sung-kyum as Yoo Dal-ho
Hong Yeo-jin as Jung Yoon-seok
Joo Jin-mo as Choi Seok-gi
Jo Mi-ryung as Myung-hwa
Kim Hyung-bum as Jo Young-chul
Choi Il-hwa as Na Shi-chan
Lee Jung-shin as Na Hong-gyu
Ahn Se-ha as Park Han-soo
Jo Hwi-joon as Roy
Yoon A-jung as Han Ji-sun
Jung Hye-sun as Im Jung-soon
Kim Ji-young as Kang Yoon-ah
Heo Jung-eun as Kang Sung-ah
Choi Hyun as Kim Doo-hyun
Hwang Seok-ha as Chairman Doo
Fei as Jenny
Maria Cordero as Tina, Jenny's friend

Ratings

Awards and nominations

International broadcast
 It aired in Philippines on GMA Network from January 11 to March 10, 2016, and reaired on GMA News TV from April 1 to June 11, 2017.
 It aired in Vietnam on D Dramas VTVCab7 from June 29, 2016.
 It aired in Thailand on 3SD from November 22, 2016.
 It aired in Malaysia on TV2 from March 31, 2017.
 It aired in Romania on Happy Channel from July 5, 2019.

References

External links
Temptation official SBS website 

2014 South Korean television series debuts
2014 South Korean television series endings
Seoul Broadcasting System television dramas
Korean-language television shows
South Korean romance television series
South Korean melodrama television series
Television series by Victory Contents